The Cicaré CH-8 is a series of ultralight, kit-built helicopters based on a single-seat Argentinian design from the late 1980s. It was later developed into a tandem two-seater, and later into a tandem side by side ULM and remains in production.

Design and development

The piston engine-powered CH-8 ultralight series use the traditional "penny-farthing" layout with two-bladed main and tail rotors.  The main rotor is formed from composites and is a teetering, semi-rigid design with 6° of twist.  The pod-and-boom fuselage has a carbon fiber and epoxy resin cabin  with a long transparent forward-opening canopy. This large windshield allows the pilot to see the tip of the ski,d making easier to get a ground reference while landing.
The frame is built on aeronautical SAE 4130 chrome molybdenum steel tube  and welded in spatial reticulated configuration.
The steel frame also carries the engine, semi-exposed behind the accommodation and connected to the main rotor shaft by a belt drive.  A slender aluminium boom, strengthened by a pair of long struts to the lower fuselage frame, carries both the tail rotor and swept fins.  The upper fin is topped with a short horizontal T-shaped tailplate, with small endplate fins, and the lower one ends with a tailskid.

Operational history
100 Helis were built between 2014 and 2021.

Specifications (CH-8)

See also

References
Notes

External links
 

Homebuilt aircraft
Single-engined piston helicopters